is a Japanese badminton player. He graduated at the Saitama Sakae high school, and represented the national junior team at the 2013 Asian Junior Championships, where the team captured the bronze medal. He joined the Unisys team in April 2014, and won his first international title at the 2016 Peru International Series.

Achievements

BWF World Tour (1 runner-up) 
The BWF World Tour, announced on 19 March 2017 and implemented in 2018, is a series of elite badminton tournaments, sanctioned by Badminton World Federation (BWF). The BWF World Tour are divided into six levels, namely World Tour Finals, Super 1000, Super 750, Super 500, Super 300 (part of the HSBC World Tour), and the BWF Tour Super 100.

Men's singles

BWF International Challenge/Series (2 titles, 1 runner-up) 
Men's singles

  BWF International Challenge tournament
  BWF International Series tournament
  BWF Future Series tournament

References

External links 
 

1995 births
Living people
Sportspeople from Tokyo
Japanese male badminton players
People from Nishitōkyō, Tokyo
21st-century Japanese people